Russ Bellant (born 1949) is an American journalist, political activist, and author.  He was an Associate of Political Research Associates.

Old Nazis, the New Right, and the Republican Party is Bellant's most widely cited work. 
Chris Simpson wrote in the preface, "This book presents some of the best new research into the seamy side of the 'Reagan Revolution.' Russ Bellant's careful dissection of the American Security Council Foundation and of certain Republican Party organizations clearly establishes that neo-fascist thinking is flourishing among some of the right-wing activists who today drape themselves in the American flag."

The Harvard Educational Review calls Old Nazis, the New Right, and the Republican Party an important book "which exposes the roots and growth of domestic fascist networks." Bellant interviewed Nikolai Nazarenko of the Cossack American Republican National Federation who proved all too willing to show his collection of Nazi memorabilia and anti-Semitic literature.

In the same book Bellant documents Nazi involvement in the Ukraine; The Nation said "Bellant's exposure of émigré Nazi leaders from Germany's World War II allies in the 1988 Bush presidential campaign was the driving force in the announced resignation of nine individuals, two of them from Ukraine". Former Office of Special Investigations director Allan A. Ryan called it, "Well-documented, and reliable."

Organizations dedicated to countering Holocaust denial such as The Nizkor Project frequently cite Bellant's work.

Bellant appeared as himself in the political documentary American Secrets.

Bibliography
Books
The Coors Connection: How Coors Family Philanthropy Undermines Democratic Pluralism. Boston: South End Press, 1991. .
Old Nazis, the New Right, and the Republican Party. (3rd ed.) Boston: South End Press, 1991. 148 p.  / . "A Political Research Associates Book."
Revised edition of Old Nazis, the New Right and the Reagan Administration: The Role of Domestic Fascist Networks in the Republican Party and Their Effect on U.S. Cold War Politics. (2nd ed.) Political Research Associates, 1989. 96 p.  / .
The Religious Right in Michigan Politics. Silver Spring, MD: Americans for Religious Liberty, 1996. .

Articles
"LaRouche Loses Libel Suit." Co-authored with Chip Berlet. The Guardian [New York], November 14, 1984.
"LaRouche Cult Continues to Grow: Researchers Call for Probe of Potentially Illegal Acts." with Chip Berlet & Dennis King. The Public Eye, Vol. 3, Issues 3-4, 1982.
"The Council for National Policy." CovertAction Information Bulletin, No. 34, Summer 1990, pp. 17-20. Full issue available.
"Balkan Nationalists Peddling Fascism." Co-authored with Howard Goldenthal. CovertAction Information Bulletin, No. 35, Fall 1990, pp. 27-28. Full issue available.
"The Free Congress Foundation Goes East." Co-authored with Louis Wolf. CovertAction Information Bulletin, No. 35, Fall 1990, pp. 29-32. Full issue available.
"G. H. W. Bush Used Nazi Collaborators to Get Elected." Press For Conversion!, No. 54, August 2004, pp. 38-41.

Interviews
"Secret Ukraine." Interview by Paul H. Rosenberg. Problems of NATO, edited by Tony Simpson. Spokesman Books, December 2017, pp. 13-22. .
Originally published as "Seven Decades of Nazi Collaboration: America’s Dirty Little Ukraine Secret," in Foreign Policy in Focus, March 2014.

References

External links
Official website

American male journalists
American political writers
21st-century American male writers
Writers from Detroit
1949 births
Living people
20th-century American male writers
20th-century American non-fiction writers
21st-century American non-fiction writers